Herman Abban (born December 19, 1994) is a Ghanaian Professional tennis player. Herman set up the Herman Abban Foundation (HAF) in 2019 to support the young and needy in the society by providing books and tennis equipments.

Tennis career
Abban has a career high ITF singles ranking of 809, achieved on 2 January 2012. Abban has represented Ghana at Davis Cup where he has a win-loss record of 4–0.

Davis Cup

Participations: (4–0)

   indicates the outcome of the Davis Cup match followed by the score, date, place of event, the zonal classification and its phase, and the court surface.

References

1994 births
Living people
Ghanaian male tennis players
Competitors at the 2019 African Games
African Games competitors for Ghana
People from Accra